Bletilla ochracea, commonly known as Chinese butterfly orchid, is a species of orchid native to Vietnam and China (Gansu, Guangxi, Guizhou, Henan, Hubei, Hunan, Shaanxi, Sichuan, Yunnan).

References

External links 
 
 
 Plant Delights Nursery, Bletilla ochracea 'Chinese Butterfly' 
 Dave's Garden, Chinese Ground Orchid, Bletilla 'Chinese Butterfly', Bletilla ochracea  
 Florida Hill Nursery, Bletilla Ochracea Orchid "Chinese Butterfly" plant
 Botany boy Plant Encyclopedia, Bletilla ochracea, the yellow flower Chinese ground orchid
 Santa Rosa Gardens, Bletilla ochracea Chinese Butterfly

ochracea
Plants described in 1913
Orchids of China
Orchids of Vietnam